Carlo Emmanuele Vizzani (1617 – 29 October 1661) was an Italian classical scholar, translator, and canonist.

Biography 
Carlo Emmanuele Vizzani was born in Bologna in 1617. He obtained his doctorate in philosophy and jurisprudence from the University of Bologna in 1634. He was a professor of logic at the University of Padua, but his knowledge in the classics drew him to Rome, where he occupied a variety of positions: consistorial lawyer, secretary of the Roman Inquisition, Referendary of the Apostolic Signatura, and canon of St. Peter. In 1646 he published a critical edition of Ocellus Lucanus' De universi natura with his own Latin translation. This important work was reissued by Joan Blaeu in 1661. In 1658 Vizzani became rector of the Sapienza University of Rome. He died in 1661 and was buried in the Dominican church of Santa Maria Sopra Minerva. His funeral monument was designed and sculpted by Domenico Guidi. Vizzani was a member of the Accademia degli Incogniti of Venice and the Accademia dei Gelati of Bologna.

Works 

 Epistola græco-latina super raptum Helenæ a Guidone Rheno depictum. Bononiae, typ. Ferronii, 1633.

References

Bibliography 
 «Carlo Emanuel Vizzani Bolognese». In : Le glorie de gli Incogniti: o vero, Gli huomini illustri dell'Accademia de' signori Incogniti di Venetia, In Venetia : appresso Francesco Valuasense stampator dell'Accademia, 1647, pp. 88–91 (on-line).
 «Carlo Emanuelle Vizzani». In : Memorie imprese, e ritratti de' signori Accademici Gelati di Bologna, In Bologna : per li Manolessi, 1672, pp. 98–102 (on-line).

1615 births
1661 deaths
People from Bologna
17th-century Italian jurists
17th-century Italian writers
17th-century translators
University of Bologna alumni
Sapienza University of Rome alumni
Academic staff of the University of Padua
Greek–Latin translators
Canon law jurists
Italian classical scholars